Richard McElreath (born 1973) is an American professor of anthropology and a director of the Max Planck Institute for Evolutionary Anthropology in Leipzig, Germany. He's an author of the Statistical Rethinking applied Bayesian statistics textbook, among the first to largely rely on the Stan statistical environment, and the accompanying rethinking R language package.

He earned his B.S. at Emory University in 1995 and a Ph.D. in anthropology under Robert Boyd at the University of California, Los Angeles in 2001 with field research in Tanzania.

Research 
In 2001 to 2002 McElreath won a fellowship to work as a postdoctoral researcher studying bounded rationality at the Max Planck Institute under Gerd Gigerenzer. Since 2002 he's working for the University of California, Davis, teaching anthropology and conducting field work. He was awarded tenure (2006) and promoted to full professor (2014), holding the chair of the Evolutionary Anthropology department from 2014 to 2015. Since 2015 he is one of the directors at the Max Planck Institute for Evolutionary Anthropology.

His main research focus lies in the evolution of cultural behaviors. Expanding on his work in anthropology, he has also been researching the social dynamics of the replication crisis in science and contributing to  statistical education. His work has been covered by professional and popular media, e.g. in Nature, The Economist Pacific Standard, and The Atlantic.

Selected publications

Books 

 McElreath, Richard and Robert Boyd, Mathematical Models of Social Evolution: A Guide for the Perplexed. University of Chicago Press, 2007
 McElreath, Richard. Statistical rethinking: A Bayesian course with examples in R and Stan. Chapman and Hall/CRC, 2015.

Articles and chapters 

 Henrich, Joseph, Robert Boyd, Samuel Bowles, Colin Camerer, Ernst Fehr, Herbert Gintis, and Richard McElreath. "In search of homo economicus: behavioral experiments in 15 small-scale societies." American Economic Review 91, no. 2 (2001): 73–78.
 Henrich, Joseph, Richard McElreath, Abigail Barr, Jean Ensminger, Clark Barrett, Alexander Bolyanatz, Juan Camilo Cardenas et al. "Costly punishment across human societies." Science 312, no. 5781 (2006): 1767–1770.
 Henrich, Joseph, Jean Ensminger, Richard McElreath, Abigail Barr, Clark Barrett, Alexander Bolyanatz, Juan Camilo Cardenas et al. "Markets, religion, community size, and the evolution of fairness and punishment." Science 327, no. 5972 (2010): 1480–1484.
 Henrich, Joseph, and Richard McElreath. "The evolution of cultural evolution." Evolutionary Anthropology: Issues, News, and Reviews: Issues, News, and Reviews 12, no. 3 (2003): 123–135.
 Dawes, Christopher T., James H. Fowler, Tim Johnson, Richard McElreath, and Oleg Smirnov. "Egalitarian motives in humans." Nature 446, no. 7137 (2007): 794.

See also
Stan (software)

References 

American anthropologists
1973 births
Living people
Emory University alumni
University of California, Los Angeles alumni
People from Landstuhl
University of California, Davis faculty
R (programming language) people
Max Planck Institute for Evolutionary Anthropology
Max Planck Institute directors